Eddie Testa (December 1, 1910 – December 9, 1998) was an American cyclist who competed in the 1932 Summer Olympics.

References

1910 births
1998 deaths
American male cyclists
Olympic cyclists of the United States
Cyclists at the 1932 Summer Olympics
Cyclists from Los Angeles